Manicotti (the plural form of the Italian word manicotto), literally "little sleeves" (< manica 'sleeve' + the diminutive ending -otto), are an Italian-American cuisine form of pasta. Manicotti are very large pasta tubes that are intended to be stuffed and baked. 

The filling is generally ricotta cheese mixed with chopped parsley, and possibly ground meat such as veal, however strictly meat filling implies cannelloni and not manicotti. They are then topped with tomato sauce.

Similar to the Italian cannelloni, manicotti can be extruded in tube form, or rolled from sheets of dough, however where manicotti are pointed, cannelloni are smooth with flat ends.

References

Types of pasta
Italian-American cuisine